Pierre Siegenthaler (born 19 July 1938) is a Swiss sailor. He competed in the Flying Dutchman event at the 1960 Summer Olympics.

References

External links
 

1938 births
Living people
Swiss male sailors (sport)
Olympic sailors of Switzerland
Sailors at the 1960 Summer Olympics – Flying Dutchman
Sportspeople from Bern
20th-century Swiss people